Ivana Lang (15 November 1912 – 2 January 1982) was a Croatian composer, pianist and piano teacher. She was born in Zagreb, Croatia, Austro-Hungarian Empire). She completed piano studies in 1937 at the Music Academy in Zagreb. Ivana Lang composed orchestral works (concert for piano and orchestra), chamber music, an opera ("The Captain of Kastav") and two ballets, "False Knight" and "Dance of the Ghosts".

Biography

Ivana Lang-Beck was born into a respectable family from Zagreb. Her father, Dr Arthur Lang was a prominent physician. He was the doctor at the Croatian National Theatre. Her mother Margaretha (born Leitgebel) was an academic painter, specialising in ceramics.

In 1937 Ivana acquired a degree in classical piano at the Zagreb Academy of Music. In addition to piano studies, she attended classes and composition studies with Prof. Milo Cipra.

Upon completion of studies at the Music Academy in 1937 she left her hometown of Zagreb in order to broaden and refine her study of composition with Joseph Marx at the Mozarteum in Salzburg. During her training with Joseph Marx she had the opportunity to explore European musical traditions and contemporary trends.

Among her famous work was composing music to poems written by Dragutin Domjanić and Antun Gustav Matoš.

Ivana Lang had married at the age of 37 to Marjan Beck with whom she had one child.

Oeuvre

In her interesting and very valuable oeuvre (consisting of 110 opus numbers), Ivana Lang paid particular attention to original folk's music idioms, especially from Istria, knowing full well, like all major proponents of this line, that she would be unable to achieve a satisfactory effect with her artistic activity if she was not persistent in promoting and disseminating the art of the people. As with the greatest masters of this movement, in the music of Ivana Lang spurred by folk models, too, there is no question of it being simply a one-sided reproduction, of a quotation; instead, it is a development and a filtration and a stylisation of the original model. Not one of her works inspired by popular strains was a common and conventional folk music picture book, rather a monument to sound in which a creator of so-called serious music, liberally but with great professionalism, making responsible use of the simple ideas of the anonymous originators and first movers from the people, elevated the vernacular sounds to the level of refined art. Directing all her attention first of all to the sung word, the composer, after that, took to more complex matter, and that was the arrangement of vernacular instrumental dance music.

Works (selection)

Agnus Dei for soprano and chamber ensemble Op 15 (1942)
Melodramas for voice and piano, Op 21 (1942)
Grotesque, for symphony orchestra Op 11 (1942)
Concerto for piano and orchestra Op 22 (1944)
The Silent Shadows, ballet in 3 acts Op 52 (1959)
To a Nameless One, four-song cycle for mezzo-soprano and piano Op 75 (1970)
Four Bagatelles for piano Op 59 (1962)
Four Bagatelles for harp and strings Op 86 (1974)
Four Compositions for piano Op 50 (1961)
The Black Olive, song cycle of five songs for dramatic soprano and piano Op 49 (1959)
Two Songs by Domjanić for voice and piano Op 17 (1942)
Two Istrian Songs from Pazin for female choir and piano Op 39 (1952)
The Dance of the Black People, ballet act with piano accompaniment Op 36 (1950)

See also
Music of Croatia

References

1912 births
1982 deaths
Musicians from Zagreb
Croatian Jews
Austro-Hungarian Jews
Croatian Austro-Hungarians
Academy of Music, University of Zagreb alumni
Croatian composers
Jewish classical composers
Women classical composers
Croatian musicians
Jewish musicians
Pupils of Joseph Marx
20th-century classical composers
20th-century women composers